The women's hammer throw event at the 2001 European Athletics U23 Championships was held in Amsterdam, Netherlands, at Olympisch Stadion on 12 and 13 July.

Medalists

Results

Final
13 July

Qualifications
12 July
Qualifying 63.00 or 12 best to the Final

Group A

Group B

Participation
According to an unofficial count, 28 athletes from 18 countries participated in the event.

 (2)
 (1)
 (3)
 (2)
 (1)
 (1)
 (3)
 (1)
 (1)
 (2)
 (1)
 (3)
 (1)
 (1)
 (1)
 (2)
 (1)
 (1)

References

Hammer throw
Hammer throw at the European Athletics U23 Championships